Louis Diercxsens (28 September 1898 – 21 April 1992) was a Belgian field hockey player who competed in the 1920 Summer Olympics and in the 1928 Summer Olympics. In 1920 he was a member of the Belgian field hockey team, which won the bronze medal.

Eight years later he finished fourth with the Belgian team at the 1928 Olympic tournament. He played all five matches as forward and scored four goals.

References

External links
 

1898 births
1992 deaths
Belgian male field hockey players
Olympic field hockey players of Belgium
Field hockey players at the 1920 Summer Olympics
Field hockey players at the 1928 Summer Olympics
Olympic bronze medalists for Belgium
Olympic medalists in field hockey
Medalists at the 1920 Summer Olympics
20th-century Belgian people